The 2019 AT&T strike was a labor strike involving about 20,000 employees of AT&T in the Southern United States. Members of the Communications Workers of America (CWA) went on strike from August 24 to August 28, following the failure to agree to new employment contracts. Following several days of protest across nine states, the strike ended with a tentative deal reached between CWA and AT&T.

Background 
On August 3, 2019, employment contracts between 20,000 members of the Communications Workers of America (CWA) and AT&T Southeast were set to expire. These workers primarily consisted of customer service representatives and technicians from AT&T's wired phone and Internet division. Leading up to this, discussions between the two parties regarding future contract agreements were proving to be unfruitful, and leading up to the expirations the CWA began to prepare for the possibility of a labor strike. The previous month, members of the CWA voted to authorize a strike if an agreement regarding contracts could not be made. On August 3, hundreds of telecommunications workers held a rally outside AT&T Midtown Center (AT&T Southeast's headquarters) in Atlanta. On August 10, the workers began to work without a contract. A meeting on August 20 between AT&T and union officials again proved fruitless, with the union alleging that proposals by the company would have reduced paid sick time, among other unwanted effects.

Course of the strike 
On August 23, the CWA announced a strike that would begin at midnight. They also filed a charge with the National Labor Relations Board alleging that AT&T was not bargaining "in good faith" and that they had failed to send proper representatives to contract discussions. A day prior on August 21, CWA locals 3120, 3121 and 3122 went on a Unfair labor practice protest in South Florida and  walked out over issues associated with violations of the National Labor Relations Act. However, these actions were unrelated to and did not prompt the mass strike the following day. In total, the strike involved workers in Alabama, Florida, Georgia, Kentucky, Louisiana, Mississippi, North Carolina, South Carolina, and Tennessee.

On August 25, Senator and 2020 Democratic Party Presidential candidate Bernie Sanders met with strikers in Louisville, Kentucky ahead of one of his campaign rallies. On August 28, following an agreement between CWA and AT&T, CWA announced the strike had ended and workers could return to their jobs that day. As part of the agreement, the two parties agreed to a 5-year contract that included increases in wages and enhancements for workers' 401(k) and pensions. In general, the agreement was considered to be favorable to the labor union.

References

Bibliography 

 
 
 
 
 
 
 
 
 
 
 
 
 
 

Manufacturing industry labor disputes in the United States
AT&T
Communications Workers of America
August 2019 events in the United States
2019 labor disputes and strikes
Labor disputes in Alabama
Labor disputes in Florida
Labor disputes in Georgia (U.S. state)
Labor disputes in Kentucky
Labor disputes in Louisiana
Labor disputes in Mississippi
Labor disputes in North Carolina
Labor disputes in South Carolina
Labor disputes in Tennessee